Christmas Joy may refer to:

Christmas Joy (Psych episode)
Christmas Joy (EP)
"Christmas Joy" The Soul Stirrers	1965